The New Left: The Anti-Industrial Revolution is a 1971 collection of essays by the philosopher Ayn Rand, in which the author argues that religion, the New Left, and similar forces are irrational and harmful. Most of the essays originally appeared in The Objectivist. A revised edition appeared in 1975, and an expanded edition edited by Peter Schwartz was published in 1999 under the title Return of the Primitive: The Anti-Industrial Revolution.

Background
The inspiration for collecting these essays into a book came from a reader, who wrote Rand a letter complimenting several of the essays and suggesting she put them out as a book to counteract the influence of the New Left among college students.

Publication history
The first edition of the book was published by New American Library in 1971, as a paperback under its Signet imprint. A revised edition, adding the essay "The Age of Envy", appeared in 1975.

In 1999, Rand's estate authorized publication of an expanded edition titled Return of the Primitive: The Anti-Industrial Revolution. It was edited by Peter Schwartz and added a new introduction by Schwartz, as well as two essays by Rand ("Racism" was included in The Virtue of Selfishness, and "Global Balkanization" was in The Voice of Reason) and three by Schwartz ("Gender Tribalism", "The Philosophy of Privation", and "Multicultural Nihilism").

Reception
The book received little attention from reviewers when it was first released. In a survey of Rand's works, historian James T. Baker described the book's essays as "shrill proclamations" that are "more negative than positive, more destructive than constructive." Rand bibliographer Mimi Reisel Gladstein said the book's topics "seem dated", but "as Rand's predictions about the negative results of some of the practices she rails against come about, one begins to appreciate the perceptiveness of her logic."

References

Footnotes

Works cited
 
 
 
 

1971 non-fiction books
American essay collections
Books about the New Left
Books by Ayn Rand
Books in political philosophy
English-language books
Objectivist books
New American Library books